William Pearson (10 November 1912 – 11 September 1987) was an Australian cricketer. He played 14 first-class cricket matches for Victoria between 1936 and 1938.

Pearson was also a leading amateur Australian rules footballer, becoming the first footballer to kick over 200 goals in a season. Playing for Old Scotch Football Club in the Victorian Amateur Football Association (VAFA), Pearson kicked 220 goals in the 1934 season, including 30 goals in a match against Brunswick. 

Pearson finished his career with Old Scotch in 1937 kicking 1022 goals from only 136 games at a remarkably high average of 7.51 a game. Since Pearson’s feat in 1934, only eleven more footballers have reached the double century.

See also
 List of Victoria first-class cricketers

References

External links
 

1912 births
1987 deaths
Australian cricketers
Victoria cricketers
People from Kerang
Cricketers from Victoria (Australia)
Old Scotch Football Club players
Australian rules footballers from Victoria (Australia)